Kanwa Asian Defence is a monthly Canadian military magazine published by the Kanwa Information Center. It is published monthly in English and Chinese versions, the latter entitled 漢和防務評論 (Kanwa Defence Review). The magazine publishes news articles, raw images, and reference reports about China and East Asia's military, foreign affairs, and national defence. The founder and editor-in-chief is Mr. Pinkov (Chinese: 平可夫).

The name of the magazine in Chinese means Han (Kan, 漢) and Yamato (Wo, 和).

References

External links

Chinese Version: , e

2004 establishments in Canada
Bilingual magazines
Monthly magazines published in Canada
Military magazines published in Canada
Magazines established in 2004